Crans may refer to:

People with the surname
 Alissa Crans, American mathematician
 Debbie C. Crans (born 1955), Danish-American chemist
 Jan Crans (born 1480), Flemish painter

Places
France:
 Crans, Ain, a commune in the Ain département
 Crans, Jura, a commune in the Jura département

Switzerland:
 Crans-Montana (Crans-sur-Sierre)
 Crans-près-Céligny, in the canton of Vaud